The second and final season of CSI: Cyber premiered on October 4, 2015. The series stars Patricia Arquette, James Van Der Beek, Shad Moss, Charley Koontz, Hayley Kiyoko, and Ted Danson.

Plot 

The second season of Cyber follows the work Avery Ryan (Patricia Arquette), as she and the team welcome D.B. Russell (Ted Danson), a Las Vegas veteran  Crime Scene Investigator recruited by Ryan to direct the FBI's Next Generation Cyber Forensics Division. Still grieving the loss of his best friend ("Hack ER"), and following a recent divorce, Russell decides to take on new challenges. Studying how crimes play out in the real world, he combines old school forensics with new school tech, providing a foil for Ryan who, this season, faces the prospect of losing her own ex-husband ("The Walking Dead"). Before being faced with the collapse of the federal government ("Legacy"), Ryan and Russell investigate a murder recorded on motion sensors ("Why-Fi"), a riot in a small town ("Blue Eyes, Brown Eyes"), questionable social media activity ("5 Deadly Sins"), child abduction ("Red Crone"), the death of a jogger ("Fit-and-Run"), a murder on webcam ("Corrupted Memory"), a series of bizarre banking hacks ("Shades of Grey"), and a death linked to an online forum ("iWitness"), all while entering the worlds of street racing ("Gone in 6 Seconds") and online dating ("Heart Me"). Later, Daniel Krumitz (Charley Koontz) and Brody Nelson (Shad Moss) meet a celebrity during an investigation into airline hacking ("404: Flight Not Found"), the team aid the NYPD when cell-phone hacking causes a citywide incident ("Going Viral"), Russell connects with a Private Investigator ("Flash Squad"), and Ryan's first case as FBI Deputy Director pits her against Python ("Python"), who infiltrates the FBI and puts the team, also including Raven Ramirez (Hayley Kiyoko) and Elijah Mundo (James Van Der Beek), at risk ("Python's Revenge").

Production 
CBS announced on May 11, 2015, that CSI: Cyber was renewed for a second season. The season premiered in October 2015, while the series continues to be executive produced by creators Carol Mendelsohn, Anthony E. Zuiker, and Ann Donahue, former CSI: NY executive producer Pam Veasey (who acts as showrunner), Jonathan Littman, and Jerry Bruckheimer. Mary Aiken, on whom the show is based, remains attached as a series producer. The season was originally supposed to have 22 episodes, but this was later reduced to 18.  Following the cancellation of CSI: Crime Scene Investigation it was also announced that Ted Danson would be joining the cast of "CSI: Cyber" as D.B. Russell, the newly appointed Director of Next Generation Cyber Forensics. Danson later announced his intent to depart  the CSI franchise at the end of Cyber's second season, while Arquette simultaneously signed on for four film projects. On May 12, 2016, CBS canceled the series.

Cast and characters

Main cast 
 Patricia Arquette as Avery Ryan, Ph.D. Avery was a Special Agent in Charge attached to Cyber, though she is later promoted to Deputy Director of the Federal Bureau of Investigation. She also heads a hack-for-good program. 
 Ted Danson as D.B. Russell, the Director of Next Generation Cyber Forensics, and a close friend of Avery's. He was recruited following a stint as the Director of the Las Vegas Crime Lab. 
 James Van Der Beek as Elijah Mundo, a senior FBI field agent assigned to Ryan's team. 
 Shad Moss as Brody Nelson, a black-hat hacker hired as part of hack-for-good. After his conviction is overturned, he undergoes training and becomes an agent.
 Charley Koontz as Daniel Krumitz, a white-hat hacker, and an FBI agent.
 Hayley Kiyoko as Raven Ramirez, a black-hat hacker serving out her prison sentence on Avery's team. She is later awarded time-served, and re-hired as a consultant.

Recurring 
 Kelly Preston as Greer Latimore; a Private Investigator, and a love interest of D.B. Russell. 
 Sean Blakemore as Marcus Silver; the Director of the Federal Bureau of Investigation.
 Alisha Boe as Grace Clarke, a friend of Avery's late-daughter.
 Marcus Giamatti as Artie Sneed; a freelance consultant contracted to Cyber. 
 Mckenna Grace as Michelle Mundo; Elijah Mundo's daughter.
 Alexie Gilmore as Devon Atwood; Elijah's wife. 
 Brent Sexton as Andrew Michaels; Avery Ryan's ex-husband.
 Gregg Henry as Calvin Mundo; Elijah's father.
 Evan Jones as Dante Wilkerson, "Python", a cyber criminal.

Guest appearances 
 Angela Trimbur as Francine Krumitz; Daniel Krumitz' sister. 
 Kelly Osbourne as Stella Kane, "Reaper", a cyber criminal.
 Elisabeth Shue as Julie Finlay, Russell's deceased best-friend (archive footage)
 Amanda Payton as Nicole Gaines

Episodes

References

2015 American television seasons
2016 American television seasons
CSI: Cyber
Cyber 02